Jaldapara National Park (Pron: ˌʤʌldəˈpɑ:rə) is a national park situated at the foothills of the Eastern Himalayas in Alipurduar District of northern West Bengal, India, and on the banks of the Torsa River. Jaldapara is situated at an altitude of 61 m and is spread across  of vast grassland with patches of riverine forests. It was declared a sanctuary in 1941 for protection of its great variety of flora and fauna.

Today, the park has the largest population of the Indian one-horned rhinoceros in the state, an animal threatened with extinction, and is a Habitat management area (Category IV).  The nearby Chilapata Forests is an elephant corridor between Jaldapara and the Buxa Tiger Reserve. Nearby is the Gorumara National Park, also known for its population of Indian rhinoceros. The Office of the Divisional Forest Officer, Jaldapara Office is situated at Nilkuthi, Cooch Behar and the Office of the Assistant Wildlife Warden is situated at the heart point of the national park, i.e. Madarihat.

History 
Toto tribes and Mech Tribes (Bodos) used to stay in this area before 1800. At that time this place was known as "Totopara". Formerly Jaldapara Wildlife Sanctuary (JWLS; established in 1941) has been elevated to Jaldapara National Park (JNP) in May 2014 and is primarily meant for the conservation of Indian Rhino.

Flora and fauna
The forest is mainly savannah covered with tall elephant grasses. The main attraction of the park is the Indian one-horned rhinoceros. The park holds the largest rhino population in India after Kaziranga National Park in Assam. Other animals in the park include Indian leopard, Indian elephants, sambar, barking deer, spotted deer, hog deer, wild boars, and gaur. A floristic investigation was made during 2016 – 2018 to observe the tree diversity and their present status in the Jaldapara National Park (JNP) which is situated in the Dooars region of West Bengal, India. A total of 294 species of trees belonging to 189 genera and 63 families, including 4 species of gymnosperms were recorded. 

Jaldapara is a paradise for bird watchers. It is one of the very few places in India, where the Bengal florican is sighted. The other birds to be found here are the crested eagle, Pallas's fish eagle, shikra, Finn's weaver, jungle fowl, peafowl (peacock), partridge, and lesser pied hornbill. Pythons, monitor lizards, kraits, cobras, geckos, and about eight species of fresh water turtles can also be found here.

Many of the animals in the park are endangered, like the Indian one-horned rhino and elephants.

References

External links

 Official Homepage
 Alipurduar District Tourism at Alipurduar District Tourism
 Jaldapara Wildlife Sanctuary at West Bengal State Tourism
Jaldapara Wildlife Sanctuary at North Bengal Tourism

Wildlife sanctuaries in West Bengal
Dooars
Tourist attractions in Alipurduar district
Protected areas established in 1941
National parks in West Bengal
Lower Gangetic Plains moist deciduous forests
1941 establishments in British India